Henrietta is found in the town of Vacoas-Phoenix, Mauritius. It is said to be the 'finishing part' of Vacoas as beyond it there is only forest.

Population and terrain 
Henrietta consists of a population of different social levels. It currently has big shops but no supermarkets. A large part consists of sugar cane plantation. It has a bus station which gives access to route lines only towards Port-Louis and all parts of Plaines-Wilhems/Moka District.

References 

Populated places in Mauritius